Samuel Benovič (born 3 January 2001) is a Slovak footballer who plays for Spartak Myjava, on loan from Spartak Trnava, as a midfielder.

Club career
Benovič made his professional Fortuna Liga debut for Spartak Trnava against MFK Ružomberok on 4 July 2020.

Honours
Spartak Trnava
Slovnaft Cup: 2021–22

References

External links
 FC Spartak Trnava official club profile 
 Futbalnet profile 
 
 

2001 births
Living people
Sportspeople from Trnava
Slovak footballers
Slovakia youth international footballers
Association football midfielders
FC Spartak Trnava players
Slovak Super Liga players